San Leonardo de Yagüe is a Spanish town and municipality located in the province of Soria, in the autonomous community of Castile and León. It is one of the most populated municipalities  of the Sorian county of Pinares.

It has primary and secondary schools (I.E.S. San Leonardo), attended by students from surrounding municipalities (Navaleno, Hontoria del Pinar, Casarejos, Espeja, Espejón, La Hinojosa, and others).

The town, which has about 2,500 inhabitants, is home to the Puertas Norma timber products factory, a manufacturer of doors and pre-hung door units. The factory employs about 700 workers.

History 
The foundation date of the village is unknown, but it is supposed to be in the 10th or 11th century. The oldest document where the village is mentioned is from 1173, in a privilege card given by Alfonso VIII.

The village is the birthplace of Juan Yagüe in 1891. Yagüe, a general in Franco's army, became notorious for instigating the massacre at Badajoz in 1936. The village was renamed after Yagüe following his death in 1952, becoming San Leonardo de Yagüe.

References 

Municipalities in the Province of Soria